Sir Robert Wynde (c. 1580 – 1652), of Ashill, Norfolk and St. Martin-in-the-Fields, Westminster, was an English politician.

He was the son of Thomas Wynde of South Wootton, Norfolk. He became a courtier, serving as Sewer in ordinary by 1621 and a Gentleman of the privy chamber from 1628 to at least 1646.

He was a Member (MP) of the Parliament of England for Castle Rising in 1614.

References

Births circa 1580
1652 deaths
English courtiers
People from Ashill, Norfolk
People from Westminster
English MPs 1614
Court of Charles II of England